The 2006–07 season the club was in the top Ukrainian football league for FC Desna Chernihiv. .

Players

Squad information

Transfers

In

Out

Statistics

Appearances and goals

|-
! colspan=16 style=background:#dcdcdc; text-align:center| Goalkeepers

 

|-
! colspan=16 style=background:#dcdcdc; text-align:center| Defenders

|-
! colspan=16 style=background:#dcdcdc; text-align:center| Midfielders  
 

 
|-
! colspan=16 style=background:#dcdcdc; text-align:center|Forwards

 
 

Last updated: 31 May 2019

Goalscorers

Last updated: 31 May 2019

References

External links
 Official website

FC Desna Chernihiv
Desna Chernihiv
FC Desna Chernihiv seasons